The European Journal of Pain is the official journal of the European Pain Federation. According to the Journal Citation Reports, the journal has a 2018 impact factor of 3.188. The journal particularly welcomes clinical trials, which are published on an occasional basis.

Regular sections in the journal are:
 Editorials and Commentaries
 Position Papers and Guidelines
 Reviews
 Original Articles
 Letters
 Bookshelf

Research articles are published under the following subject headings:
 Neurobiology
 Neurology
 Experimental Pharmacology
 Clinical Pharmacology
 Psychology
 Behavioural Therapy
 Epidemiology
 Cancer Pain
 Acute Pain
 Clinical Trials

References

Anesthesiology and palliative medicine journals
Wiley-Blackwell academic journals
Publications established in 1997
English-language journals
Academic journals associated with international learned and professional societies of Europe